The 2017 Kelly Cup Playoffs of the ECHL began on April 12, 2017, following the conclusion of the 2016–17 ECHL regular season.

Playoff format
At the end of the regular season the top four teams in each division qualify for the playoffs and are seeded one through four based on highest point total earned in the season. The first two rounds of the playoffs are held within the division with the first seed facing the fourth seed and the second seed facing the third. The division champions then play each other in a conference championship. The Kelly Cup finals pits the Eastern Conference champion against the Western Conference champion.  All four rounds are a best-of-seven format.

Playoff seeds
After the regular season, 16 teams qualify for the playoffs. On March 4, the Toledo Walleye were the first team to qualify during the regular season and on April 8 they clinched the Brabham Cup with the best record in the ECHL.

Eastern Conference

North Division
Adirondack Thunder – North Division champions, 93 pts
Reading Royals – 88 pts
Brampton Beast – 88 pts
Manchester Monarchs – 85 pts

South Division
Florida Everblades – South Division champions, 97 pts
Greenville Swamp Rabbits – 86 pts 
South Carolina Stingrays – 84 pts 
Orlando Solar Bears – 82 pts

Western Conference

Central Division
Toledo Walleye – Central Division champions, Brabham Cup winners, 106 pts
Fort Wayne Komets – 98 pts
Quad City Mallards – 84 pts
Kalamazoo Wings – 80 pts

Mountain Division
Allen Americans – Mountain Division champions, 104 pts
Colorado Eagles – 99 pts
Idaho Steelheads – 91 pts
Utah Grizzlies– 79 pts

Playoff brackets

Division semifinals 
Home team is listed first.

North Division

(1) Adirondack Thunder vs. (4) Manchester Monarchs 
Because of the unavailability of the SNHU Arena during most of the first round, Adirondack were scheduled to host five of the seven games; this resulted in a 2–5 schedule where the lower seeded team hosted the first two games.

(2) Reading Royals vs. (3) Brampton Beast

South Division

(1) Florida Everblades vs. (4) Orlando Solar Bears

(2) Greenville Swamp Rabbits vs. (3) South Carolina Stingrays 
The two teams and the ECHL agreed on a 2-2-1-1-1 schedule due to the close proximity.

Central Division

(1) Toledo Walleye vs. (4) Kalamazoo Wings 
The two teams and the ECHL agreed on a 2-2-1-1-1 schedule due to the close proximity.

(2) Fort Wayne Komets vs. (3) Quad City Mallards

Mountain Division

(1) Allen American vs. (4) Utah Grizzlies

(2) Colorado Eagles vs. (3) Idaho Steelheads

Division finals 
Home team is listed first.

North Division

(3) Brampton Beast vs. (4) Manchester Monarchs

South Division

(1) Florida Everblades vs. (3) South Carolina Stingrays

Central Division

(1) Toledo Walleye vs. (2) Fort Wayne Komets

Mountain Division

(1) Allen Americans vs. (2) Colorado Eagles

Conference finals
Home team is listed first.

Eastern Conference

(N4) Manchester Monarchs vs. (S3) South Carolina Stingrays

Western Conference

(C1) Toledo Walleye vs. (M2) Colorado Eagles

Kelly Cup finals 
Home team is listed first.

(Mountain #2) Colorado Eagles vs. (South #3) South Carolina Stingrays

Statistical leaders

Skaters
These are the top ten skaters based on points.

''GP = Games played; G = Goals; A = Assists; Pts = Points; +/– = Plus/minus; PIM = Penalty minutes

Goaltending

This is a combined table of the top five goaltenders based on goals against average and the top five goaltenders based on save percentage, with at least 240 minutes played. The table is sorted by GAA, and the criteria for inclusion are bolded.

GP = Games played; W = Wins; L = Losses; OTL = Overtime Losses; SA = Shots against; GA = Goals against; GAA = Goals against average; SV% = Save percentage; SO = Shutouts; TOI = Time on ice (in minutes)

See also 
 2016–17 ECHL season
 List of ECHL seasons

References

External links
ECHL website

Kelly Cup playoffs
2016–17 ECHL season